IUP may refer to:

 Indiana University of Pennsylvania, a public research university in Indiana County, Pennsylvania
 IUP Crimson Hawks, the intercollegiate athletic program of the above school
 IUP Portfolio, a Swedish short for individual development plan
 IUP (software), a computer software that provides a portable, scriptable toolkit for GUI building.
 Industrial Union Party
 Interconnect User Part, UK specific SS7 protocol
 Inter-University Program for Chinese Language Study at Tsinghua University
 Intrauterine Pregnancy, the normal location for a pregnancy to occur
 Intrinsically unstructured protein
 Irish Unionist Party, an alternate name for the Irish Unionist Alliance, a political party founded in 1891. 
Initial Upper Paleolithic, the earliest culture of modern humans in Europe